The Port of San Diego is a seaport in San Diego, California. It is located on San Diego Bay in southwestern San Diego County, California, and is a self-supporting district established in 1962 by an act of the California State Legislature. In addition to port activities, the Port District controls San Diego Bay and owns and manages the Bay's immediate waterfront under the state's Tidelands Trust.

Together with the National City Marine Terminal, the Port of San Diego is the primary port of entry for Honda, Fiat, Audi, Mazda, Acura, Isuzu, Volkswagen, Nissan, Mitsubishi Fuso, and Hino Motors into America. The Port holds a 24 1/2-year lease with Dole Food Company bringing in much of the country's banana crop. It is also the third-busiest cruise ship port in California.

The Port is governed by a seven-member Board of Port Commissioners. One commissioner each is appointed by the city councils of Chula Vista, Coronado, Imperial Beach and National City, and three commissioners are appointed by the San Diego City Council. The Board establishes policies under which the Port's staff – supervised by the Executive Director – conducts its daily operation.

History
The San Diego Unified Port District was created in 1962 after the California State legislature passed Senate Bill 41 and the San Diego County Board of Supervisors certified it. In 1964, voters approved a $10.9 million bond for capital improvements. Improvements included the development of a new air terminal, preparation for Harbor Island to be leased, and construction of a new cargo terminal in National City. In 1970, the first cruise ship to offer scheduled cruises out of San Diego since the creation of the Port began making 10-day trips to Mexico. In 1980, the Port completed a wildlife refuge in Chula Vista in an effort to improve the ecological balance of the Bay. In 1983, the San Diego Cruise Industry Consortium was formed to promote San Diego as a cruise destination and homeport. Three years later, the B Street Pier Cruise Ship Terminal was officially dedicated. That year, over 26,000 passengers embarked and disembarked at the terminal. In 1989, the Port-funded, $165 million, waterfront San Diego Convention Center opened.

In 1990, The Pasha Group began importing vehicles (Isuzus) at the National City Marine Terminal. A total of 15,589 vehicle units were imported the first year. Pasha now imports over 400,000 vehicles annually. In 1993, the Port and Tenth Avenue Cold Storage Company celebrated the grand opening of San Diego's first on-dock cold storage facility, built for $11 million, at the Tenth Avenue Marine Terminal. In 2001, the Board of Port Commissioners announced a 20-year lease with Dole Food Company. This signified the Port's entry into the refrigerated containerized cargo market. Dole ships 1.8 billion pounds of bananas annually.
In 2012, the Port signed a new lease with Dole Food Company for an additional 24 1/2 years.

Maritime

The Port of San Diego administers two marine cargo facilities, Tenth Avenue Marine Terminal and National City Marine Terminal. The Tenth Avenue Marine Terminal is a  multi-purpose eight berth facility. Inbound cargo includes refrigerated commodities, fertilizer, cement, break bulk commodities, and forest products. The terminal features an on-dock state-of-the-art  square foot cold storage facility warehousing a variety of fresh produce and other perishables. The National City Marine Terminal is a  seven berth facility operated by The Pasha Group, which processed over 450,000 vehicles during fiscal year 2016. The National City Marine Terminal serves as the primary port of entry for Honda, Acura, Isuzu, Volkswagen, Nissan, Mitsubishi Fuso, and Hino Motors.

Cruise

The Port's main cruise facility is located downtown. The main facility, at B Street Pier in downtown San Diego, along North Harbor Drive, has three cruise berths. The Port also redeveloped the historic Broadway Pier to create a second cruise-ship pier and terminal, which opened in December 2010.

As of 2019, San Diego is the third-busiest cruise port in California. Three cruise lines home-port in San Diego: Holland America, Celebrity Cruises, and Disney Cruise Line. Holland America uses San Diego as a home port during the winter season. Disney and Carnival Cruise Lines have seasonal Mexican cruises in the spring and fall, as well as a Panama Canal cruise at the end of the visit. Multiple other cruise lines use San Diego as a port of call.

The Port of San Diego experienced a 44-percent growth in cruise calls between 2002 and 2006, growing from 122 to 219 calls. Passenger numbers more than doubled in that time, from 276,000 in 2002 to 619,000 in 2006. Cruise ship business peaked in 2008, when the Port hosted 252 ship calls and more than 800,000 passengers. By 2011, the number of ship calls had fallen to 103, a decline blamed on the slumping economy as well as fear of travel to Mexico due to well-publicized violence there. The Mexican government worked to improve the Mexican Riviera destination as well as public safety, driving a return of consumer demand. In 2016, the Port of San Diego's cruise business began an expected rebound, largely driven by growth in business for Holland America Cruise Line and Disney Cruise Lines. The number of ship calls grew from 68 in the 2014-2015 season to 102 in the 2015-2016 season. In 2019-2020 the Port expects approximately 92 cruise calls and nearly 300,000 passengers.

Newsworthy events
In November 2010 a crippled cruise ship, Carnival Splendor, was towed to the San Diego cruise ship port after drifting for four days without power or electricity following an engine room fire.

In May 2013, Celebrity Cruises' Solstice became the longest cruise ship to date to dock in San Diego, during a Wine Country Coastal Cruise.

On July 13, 2016, Vice President Joe Biden made a historic visit to the port, delivering a speech at the Tenth Avenue Marine Terminal. 

Ships sometimes make unscheduled stops in San Diego because of storm warnings along the Mexico cruise route. During one such diverted call in 2018, San Diego hosted the largest cruise ship ever to dock in San Diego, the 4,500-passenger Norwegian Bliss. The largest ships that normally call in San Diego hold 3,000 passengers.

In July 2022, the port held a groundbreaking ceremony for a $1.35 billion project to construct a resort hotel and convention center on the Chula Vista Bayfront.

Environment

The Port engages in public education for both adults and school children regarding pollution prevention. The Port protects San Diego bay through storm water management and endangered species management. In addition, the bay is protected through removal of hazardous waste and contaminated sediments.

The Port of San Diego has assisted in the restoration and enhancement of over 280 acres of valuable environmental habitat including Emory Cove, and the Chula Vista Wildlife Reserve. The port also started the Green Business Network, which is a voluntary sustainability program that provides education and resources to businesses along the waterfront, in order to sustain the ecosystem.

Real estate

Real estate is one of five strategic activity areas of the Port of San Diego. The Port currently administers approximately 800 separate business agreements. Revenue from real estate assets and developments, primarily building and ground rents and concession fees, was approximately $96 million in FY 2014-2015. The Port of San Diego collects rents from many hotels, restaurants, parking facilities, yacht clubs, etc. around San Diego Bay.

Hotels
San Diego Bay is home to many large-scale luxury hotels. The Port of San Diego is the landlord for 17 hotels, including the 40-story Manchester Grand Hyatt Hotel and the 25-story San Diego Marriott Marquis & Marina. An 18th hotel, the San Diego Intercontinental, began construction in June 2016 on the downtown waterfront and opened in September 2018, bringing the InterContinental brand back to the San Diego market after a 30-year absence. The Port also hosts hotels in Point Loma, Harbor Island, and Shelter Island.

Shipyards
There are currently three shipyards on San Diego Bay, National Steel and Shipbuilding Company (NASSCO), Continental Maritime of San Diego (Huntington Ingalls), and Southwest Marine (BAE Systems). NASSCO is the largest new-construction shipyard on the west coast of the United States; "specializing in auxiliary and support ships for the U.S. Navy and oil tankers and dry cargo carriers for commercial markets."

Harbor Police

The San Diego Harbor Police Department is the law enforcement authority for the Port of San Diego. Harbor Police is the premier police presence in the San Diego Bay, the San Diego International Airport and on all Port Tidelands. Harbor Police jurisdiction extends through the Port's five member cities: Chula Vista, Coronado, Imperial Beach, National City and San Diego.

The Harbor Police Department is responsible for Public Safety and Homeland Security on land, sea and in the air. It provides the highest level of security to the entire Port Tidelands and plays an integral role in homeland security.

Every sworn Harbor Police Officer is outfitted with a Patrol Rifle, Firefighting and HAZMAT Protective Equipment. Officers are fully sworn Peace Officers in the State of California and Certified Marine Firefighters.

The Harbor Police utilizes specialized units to provide high-level security operations which includes;

• Dive Rescue Team - the premier Police Dive Unit serving the San Diego Region for; Underwater Investigations, Rescue,  Underwater Hazardous Device Detection, Body Recovery and bring a complement of advanced underwater technology not typically found on a Public Safety Dive Team such as specialized sonar and robotic technology.

• Explosive K-9 Unit - these highly trained Dog Handlers and their Canine Partners are the primary response for explosive detection at the San Diego International Airport and serve the San Diego Region for Mutual Aid.

• Task-Force Officers - Harbor Police Officers may also be assigned to regional special task forces such as the FBI Joint Terrorism Task Force, Narcotics Task Forces and Maritime Task Forces.

See also

 List of ports in the United States
 Port of Hueneme
 Port of Long Beach
 Port of Los Angeles
 Port of Oakland
 Port of San Francisco
 Port of Seattle
 Port of Vancouver

References

External links

San Diego
San Diego Bay
Buildings and structures in San Diego County, California
Buildings and structures in San Diego
Economy of San Diego
Chula Vista, California
Coronado, California
Imperial Beach, California
National City, California
Government of San Diego
Government of San Diego County, California
1962 establishments in California